Diogo José Pereira de Fortunato Antunes (born 2 November 1992 in Oeiras) is a Portuguese sprinter competing primarily in the 100 metres. He represented his country at three consecutive European Championships.

International competitions

1Did not finish in the final

Personal bests

Outdoor
100 metres – 10.20 (+0.7 m/s, Lisbon 2021)
200 metres – 21.52 (+0.6 m/s, Lisbon 2014)

Indoor
60 metres – 6.67 (Pombal 2016)
200 metres – 22.00 (Pombal 2015)

References

1992 births
Living people
People from Oeiras, Portugal
Portuguese male sprinters
S.L. Benfica athletes
Athletes (track and field) at the 2018 Mediterranean Games
Mediterranean Games bronze medalists for Portugal
Mediterranean Games medalists in athletics
Sportspeople from Lisbon District